Bianca Guaccero (Bitonto, 15 January 1981), is an Italian actress, singer and TV presenter.

In February 2010, she resumed her notable role of Carolina Scapece in the Rai Uno mini-series Capri 3. She had played the same part of the conniving Caroline in the first and second Capri series. In 2009, she was one of the cast of Il Bene e il Male ("The Good and the Bad") in which she portrayed a policewoman. In 2006, she had starred in the title role of Assunta Spina, a television mini-series remake of the 1948 film.

Career 
Guaccero was born in Bitonto, a comune in the province of Bari, Italy. She began her career in Italian television in 1996 at the age of fifteen with the variety programme Sotto a Chi Tocca, which also featured showgirl Pamela Prati and comedian Pippo Franco.

In 1999, she made her acting debut in the film Terra Bruciata, directed by Fabio Segatori, in which she played the part of Maria. Since then she has performed regularly in both television and the cinema, and has appeared twice on stage in theatrical productions.

One of her most notable performances has been in the role of the malicious, conniving Carolina Scapece in the Rai Uno mini-series Capri, Capri 2 and Capri 3. She also starred in the title role of Assunta Spina, a mini-series remake of the 1948 film which starred Academy Award-winning actress Anna Magnani. 
 
In 2008, Guaccero co-hosted the 58th edition of the Sanremo Music Festival with Pippo Baudo and Andrea Osvárt.

Filmography

Television

Films

Television 
 Sotto a Chi Tocca (1996), variety programme
 Ama Il Tuo Nemico 2 (2001), mini-series
 La Memoria e il Perdona (2001), mini-series - Caterina/Isabel
 John XXIII: The Pope of Peace (2002), film
 Mudu (2003), variety programme
 Tutti i Sogni del Mondo (2003), mini-series - Daniela
 Benedetti dal Signore-Missione Zara (2004), film - Zara
 Mai Storie d'Amore in Cucina (2004), film - Evelina Bruni
 La Tassinara (2004), mini-series - Vittoria
 Imperium: Saint Peter (2005), film - Silvia
 Assunta Spina (2006), mini-series - title role
 Capri (2006), mini-series - Carolina Scapece
 Tutte Donne Tranne Me (2007), variety programme
 La Terza Verità (2007), mini-series - Lidia Roccella
 Capri 2 (2008), mini-series - Carolina Scapece
 La Stella della Porta Accanto (2008), mini-series - Stella
 58th Edition of The Sanremo Music Festival, (2008) - co-host
 Il Bene e Il Male (2009), series - Grazia Micheli
 Capri 3, (2010), mini-series - Carolina Scapece

Theatre 
 Il Sogno del Principe di Salina - L'Ultimo Gattopardo (2006) - Angelica
 Poveri Ma Belli (2008–2009) - Giovanna

References

External links 
Official website (in Italian)

Bianca Guaccero's Photogallery (in Italian)

1981 births
Living people
People from Bitonto
Italian stage actresses
Italian film actresses
Italian television actresses